Carlton Soccer Club was an Australian professional association football club based in Jolimont, Melbourne in 1997. They were admitted into the National Soccer League in the 1997–98 season for their four seasons in the competition until the club folded in 2000.

The list encompasses the records set by the club, their managers and their players. The player records section itemises the club's leading goalscorers and those who have made most appearances in first-team competitions. It also records notable achievements by Carlton players on the international stage. Attendance records at Carlton are also included.

Honours and achievements
 National Soccer League Premiership
 Runners-up (1): 1997–98

 National Soccer League Championship
 Runners-up (1): 1998

Player records

Appearances

Most appearances
Competitive matches only, includes appearances as substitute. Numbers in brackets indicate goals scored.

Goalscorers

Top goalscorers
Alex Moreira was the all-time top goalscorer for Carlton.

Competitive matches only. Numbers in brackets indicate appearances made.

International
This section refers only to caps won while a Carlton player.

 First capped player: John Markovski, for Australia against Chile on 7 February 1998
 Most capped player: Simon Colosimo with 9 caps.

Club records

Matches
 Record win: 5–0 against South Melbourne, National Soccer League, 12 April 1998
 Record consecutive wins: 6, from 25 April 2000 to 28 May 2000
 Record consecutive defeats: 8, from 28 February 1999 to 25 April 1999

Goals
 Most NSL goals scored in a season: 55 in 34 matches, National Soccer League, 1999–2000
 Fewest NSL goals scored in a season: 44 in 26 matches, National Soccer League, 1997–98
 Most NSL goals conceded in a season: 47 in 28 matches, National Soccer League, 1998–99
 Fewest NSL goals conceded in a season: 24 in 26 matches, National Soccer League, 1997–98

Points
 Most points in a season: 58 in 26 matches, National Soccer League, 1999–2000
 Fewest points in a season: 31 in 28 matches, National Soccer League, 1998–99

Attendances
 Highest attendance at Carlton: 10,632 against South Melbourne, National Soccer League, 21 December 1997
 Lowest attendance at Carlton: 1,548 against Newcastle Breakers, National Soccer League, 23 March 1998

References

Carlton